Santiago Abascal Conde (born 14 April 1976) is a Spanish  politician and since September 2014 the leader of the national-conservative political party Vox. Abascal is a member of the Congress of Deputies representing Madrid since 2019. Before the creation of Vox, Abascal was long a member of the People's Party, served as legislator in the Basque Parliament, founded the Spanish nationalist Fundación para la Defensa de la Nación Española (DENAES) and exerted the role of director of publicly funded entities of the Community of Madrid.

Biography

Early life 
Abascal was born in Bilbao. Abascal descends from a line of prominent politicians in the Province of Álava: his father Santiago Abascal Escuza was a politician and a member of the People's Party, and his grandfather Manuel Abascal Pardo was the mayor of Amurrio from 1963-79, during the Dictatorship of Franco and Spanish transition to democracy. Because of their political work, Abascal's family was routinely threatened by the terrorist group ETA.

Political career 

He became a member of the People's Party when he was 18, in 1994. Abascal was city councillor of Llodio for two terms (1999–2007). He served in the Basque Parliament from January 2004 to February 2005 representing Álava. He later served again in the regional legislature from October 2005 to January 2009.

After he left Basque politics, Esperanza Aguirre, the regional president of the Community of Madrid, found him a niche in the region by handpicking him to the post of director of the Data Protection Agency of the Community of Madrid (2010–2012). Abascal was later appointed to another post as Director of the Foundation for Patronage and Social Sponsorship (2013), a publicly-funded entity without known activity during Abascal's spell.

Abascal left the PP in 2013 and helped to found a new party, Vox, which was formed on the same day that the Foundation for Patronage and Social Sponsorship dissolved. After Vox's bad result in the May 2014 European Parliament election in which it failed to obtain any seats, inner strife between a faction represented by party members such as Ignacio Camuñas, José Luis González Quirós and Alejo Vidal-Quadras, and a hardline faction, featuring Abascal along with other figures of the DENAES Foundation, followed. The moderate faction became estranged from the party, and Abascal became the new president on 20 September 2014.

During 2020 and 2021 electoral campaigns for regional elections in Basque Country and Catalonia, multiple electoral events featuring Abascal as one of speakers were attacked by radical political opponents on the premises of "Vox's legal electoral events in these provinces being acts of provocation".

Political positions 

Abascal's political programme for 2018 includes the expulsion of all illegal immigrants, the construction of "impassable walls" in the Spanish African enclaves of Ceuta and Melilla, the prohibition of the teaching of Islam, the exaltation of "national heroes", the elimination of all regional parliaments and opposition to Catalan nationalism. He used anti-Muslim rhetoric in 2019 and called for a new Reconquista or reconquest of Spain.

He promotes climate change denial  and believes that global warming is the "greatest swindle in history".

On economic issues, he claims the legacy of 1996–2004 Prime Minister José Maria Aznar of the People's Party and supports a liberal and conservative line, including a sharp reduction in public spending.

Personal life
He first married Ana Belén Sánchez, who was herself a PP candidate in local elections in Llodio and Zuia; they had two children. In June 2018, he married the Spanish blogger and influencer Lidia Bedman-Lapeña. He had two children with Bedman. Abascal is a longtime member of the Spanish Ornithological Society. Abascal is an affiliate of the ultraconservative association HazteOir (HO) and was the recipient of a HO Award in 2012.

Due to recurrent death threats for his political views and work, Abascal is licensed to carry and use a handgun for self-defence. Namely, the license type B, granted to civilians proved to undergo a real high risk of being attacked. Under strictest Spanish gun laws, such licenses are rare, only about 0.02% of population hold them.

Abascal was one of several Spanish politicians who tested positive for the COVID-19 virus during the 2020 pandemic.

References

External links
Official website

1976 births
Critics of multiculturalism 
Living people
Male critics of feminism
Members of the 7th Basque Parliament
Members of the 8th Basque Parliament
Members of the 13th Congress of Deputies (Spain)
Members of the 14th Congress of Deputies (Spain)
Signers of the Madrid Charter
Anti-Masonry
Spanish anti-communists
Spanish nationalists
Spanish people of Basque descent
Spanish Roman Catholics 
Spanish sociologists
University of Deusto alumni
Vox (political party) politicians
Municipal councillors in the Basque Country (autonomous community)
Politicians from Bilbao